Visweswaran is an Indian surname. Notable people with the surname include:

Chitra Visweswaran (born 1950), Indian dancer
R. Visweswaran (1944–2007), Indian musician

Indian surnames